The 1948 United States presidential election in Montana took place on November 2, 1948 as part of the 1948 United States presidential election. Voters chose four representatives, or electors to the Electoral College, who voted for president and vice president.

Montana voted for the Democratic nominee, President Harry S. Truman, over the Republican nominee, New York Governor Thomas E. Dewey. Truman won Montana by a substantial margin of 9.94%. , this is the last election in which Carter County and Prairie County voted for a Democratic presidential candidate. As of the 2020 presidential election, this (and the prior election) mark the last time that Montana has voted Democratic in two consecutive presidential elections.

Results

Results by county

See also
 United States presidential elections in Montana

References

Montana
1948
1948 Montana elections